Mike Felumlee, a native of Crystal Lake, Illinois (a suburb of Chicago), is chiefly known as the current drummer for the rock band The Smoking Popes. He is known to a lesser extent for his stint of several years as drummer in the band Alkaline Trio and for his solo music.

The Smoking Popes 
Felumlee was the drummer on all of the Popes albums prior to the live album At Metro, released in 2006 in conjunction with a long-awaited reunion of the band. Reportedly, Felumlee discussed with Popes frontman Josh Caterer rejoining the band for its reunion but declined, due to personal relations between himself and the Popes having become a little tense.

He rejoined The Smoking Popes in April 2015, replacing Neil Hennessy who was relocating.

Elsewhere 
After the Smoking Popes split in 1999, Felumlee joined Alkaline Trio.  He was the drummer on the album From Here To Infirmary. Felumlee left Alkaline Trio in 2001, reportedly due to personal friction with Matt Skiba.

In 2005, Mike played the drums on the self-titled debut release of the Chicago band This Is Me Smiling.

As a drummer, Felumlee was also a founding member of the band Duvall, but his participation in the band was short-lived, being replaced by Rob Kellenberger (previously of the bands Slapstick and Tuesday) not long into the band's existence.

Felumlee founded and ran for several years the small, independent record label Double Zero Records, originally conceived as a vehicle to release some then-unreleased Smoking Popes material after the band was dropped from its major label, Capitol, in 1998. The label later released material by The Honor System, Duvall, The Red Hot Valentines, Split Habit, Ryan's Hope, Amazing Transparent Man and Retro Morning. The label operated for several years before being closed down.

In June 2016, Felumlee and his wife launched their YouTube channel "Live From The Rock Room" which is a video series featuring punk and indie bands performing in their tiny home studio in Westmont, Illinois. Dan Wallach (of Chicago's Artistic Integrity Records) and Ken Nowka (a long time friend of Mike's) also assist in the production of the series.

References

1974 births
Living people
American punk rock drummers
American male drummers
Musicians from Chicago
Alkaline Trio members
Smoking Popes members
People from Crystal Lake, Illinois
20th-century American drummers
21st-century American drummers